In military terms, 94th Division or 94th Infantry Division may refer to:

 94th Division (People's Republic of China)
 94th Infantry Division (German Empire)
 94th Infantry Division (Wehrmacht)
 94th Division (Imperial Japanese Army)
 94th Guards Rifle Division (Soviet Union)
 94th Infantry Division (United States)